Cannock Chase High School is a secondary school with academy status in Cannock, Staffordshire. The school is situated just north of the town centre, towards Blackfords, east of Cannock Chase Hospital.

History

Grammar school
Cannock Grammar School opened in September 1955 as a coeducational grammar school. The sixth form opened in September 1959. By 1962 it had 650 boys and girls. Next door was Calving Hill Secondary Modern School.

Comprehensive
The school changed its name to Chenet Comprehensive in 1976, when it switched from a Grammar to a Comprehensive system. In 1986 Chenet Comprehensive school merged with neighbouring Sherbrook School, on Hednesford Road.  The school became Cannock Chase High School.

The school has recently been re-awarded specialist science school status, specialising in both science and mathematics.

In 2011 it converted to Academy Status.

Academic performance

In 2016 the school was inspected by Ofsted and judged to Require Improvement. In 2018 it was inspected again and judged Good; as of 2020 this is the most recent inspection.

In 2019 the school's Progress 8 measure at GCSE was average. The proportion of children entered for the English Baccalaureate was 5%, compared to 34% for the local authority and 40% in England. The proportion of children achieving Grade 5 or above in English and maths GCSEs was 33%, compared to 37% for the local authority and 43% for England. Performance at A level in 2019 was average.

Notable faculty
 Philip Sugden (historian)
 Jane Swinnerton, professional field hockey player

Notable former pupils

 Ritch Battersby, drummer in The Wildhearts
 Stanley Victor Collymore, former footballer and pundit for Talksport
 Steve Edge, comedian and actor
 Gerald Gary "Jed" Mercurio OBE, television writer, producer, director and novelist.

Cannock Grammar School
 Chrissie Glazebrook, author
 J. P. Wearing, author, former Head Boy

References

External links
 Cannock Grammar School Former Pupils' Association
 EduBase

News items
 Stars in their Eyes on October 2002

Academies in Staffordshire
Educational institutions established in 1986
1986 establishments in England
Secondary schools in Staffordshire
Cannock